Jakher Dhan is a Bengali adventure thriller film directed by Haricharan Bhanja based on a same name novel of Hemendra Kumar Roy. This is the first film of Bimal-Kumar series, released on 1 April 1939 under the banner of East India Film Company.

Plot
Bimal and Kumar, two daredevil Bengali friends like to go adventures. One day Kumar finds out a map of treasure in his grandfather's trunk. He discloses it to his friend Bimal. Bimal and Kumar together travel to the unknown jungle to discover the hidden treasure. One dangerous person Karali Mukherjee is also wants the treasure, he chases them secretly to capture it by any means.

Cast
 Ahindra Choudhury
 Jahar Ganguly
 Chhaya Devi
 Kumar Mitra
 Mrinalkanti Ghosh
 Rabi Ray
 Sheila Haldar
 Sushil Ray
 Radharani
 Shishubala

See also
 Jawker Dhan
 Sagardwipey Jawker Dhan

References

External links
 

1939 films
Indian adventure thriller films
Bengali-language Indian films
Films based on Indian novels
Indian black-and-white films
1930s Bengali-language films